The city of São Paulo in Brazil is a large metropolitan city that has several levels of subdivision.  Administratively, the municipality is divided into 32 boroughs, each in turn divided into 96 wards (distritos, or districts).  Locally, wards may contain one or more neighborhoods.

Administrative zones
The subprefectures are officially grouped into nine regions (or "zones"), taking into account their geographical position and history of occupation. These regions are used only in technical and governmental agencies and are not identified by any visual communication in the city.

Subprefectures
Boroughs in São Paulo are governed by subprefectures (from 2016 to 2018 named regional prefectures) created—at least in theory—to give more financial autonomy to local governments.  There are 32 subprefectures.

Wards
Wards in São Paulo, called Distritos (districts), are subdivisions of the boroughs, without a self-government.

Neighborhoods
Some districts are further divided into bairros, which are the equivalent of neighborhoods in English.

Geographic areas
The city of São Paulo recognizes ten geographical areas used to reference locations in the city. These zones were established by dividing the city radially from the center and each is represented by a different color that is used on city buses and street signs. The only criterion used for this division is geographic boundaries (roads, rivers, etc.), having no relation whatsoever to the administrative divisions. Some districts can be partly in one geographic area, and partly in another.

References

Geography of São Paulo